Squirrel Point Light is a lighthouse marking the southwestern point of Arrowsic Island on the Kennebec River.  It was established in 1898, as part of a major upgrade of the river's lights — the Doubling Point Light and the separate Range Lights on the point, Perkins Island Light, and Squirrel Point Light were all built at the same time.  The light station was listed on the National Register of Historic Places as Squirrel Point Light Station on January 21, 1988.

Description and history
Arrowsic Island is a large island on the Mid Coast of Maine, bounded by a number of tidal rivers.  The main one, the Kennebec River, is on the west side of the island, flowing south from the major port and shipbuilding city of Bath to the Gulf of Maine.  Squirrel Point is the southwestern tip of the island.  The light station at Squirrel Point includes a tower, keeper's house, barn, boathouse, and oil house.  The tower is an octagonal wood-frame structure, with the lantern house topped by a ventilator and surrounded by an iron railing and wooden bracketed gallery.  A gabled sound signal chamber is attached to one side.  The keeper's house is a two-story wood-frame structure with a cross-gable roof.

The United States Congress authorized improvements to the aids to navigation on the Kennebec River in 1895, and this station was built under that authorization in 1898.  The oil house was added in 1906, and the station was automated in 1982.

Gallery

See also

National Register of Historic Places listings in Sagadahoc County, Maine

References

Lighthouses completed in 1898
Lighthouses on the National Register of Historic Places in Maine
Lighthouses in Sagadahoc County, Maine
Historic districts on the National Register of Historic Places in Maine
National Register of Historic Places in Sagadahoc County, Maine
1898 establishments in Maine